Livnim (lit. Birches) is a community settlement in northern Israel. Located northwest of the Sea of Galilee in the western Ginosar Valley, it falls under the jurisdiction of Merom HaGalil Regional Council.

History
The community was founded in 1982 by members of nearby moshavim as a workers' moshav, on the land of the depopulated Palestinian village of Ghuwayr Abu Shusha. In 1989 it became a community settlement. It is named after a plant that grows in the area.

References

Community settlements
Populated places in Northern District (Israel)
Populated places established in 1982
1982 establishments in Israel